German XI. Corps (XI. Armeekorps) was a corps in the German Army during World War II.

Commanders

 Artillery General (General der Artillerie) Emil Leeb, 1 September 1939 – 1 March 1940
 Infantry General (General der Infanterie) Joachim von Kortzfleisch, 1 March 1940 – 6 October 1941 
 Infantry General (General der Infanterie) Eugen Ott, 6 October 1941 – 10 December 1941
 Infantry General (General der Infanterie) Joachim von Kortzfleisch, 10 December 1941 – 1 June 1942
 Colonel-General (Generaloberst) Karl Strecker, 1 June 1942 – 2 February 1943

After reformation

 Colonel-General (Generaloberst) Erhard Raus, 10 February 1943 – 1 November 1943 
 Artillery General (General der Artillerie) Wilhelm Stemmermann, 5 December 1943 – 18 February 1944 
 Infantry General (General der Infanterie) Rudolf von Bünau, 20 March 1944 – 16 March 1945
 Artillery General (General der Artillerie) Horst von Mellenthin, 16 March 1945 – 20 March 1945  
 Infantry General (General der Infanterie) Rudolf von Bünau, 20 March 1945 – 6 April 1945
 Infantry General (General der Infanterie) Friedrich Wiese, 6 April 1945 – 8 May 1945

Area of operations
Poland - September 1939 - May 1940 
France - May 1940 - June 1941 
Eastern Front, southern sector - June 1941 - October 1942  	
Stalingrad - October 1942 - February 1943	
Eastern Front, southern sector - March 1943 - January 1944 	
Cherkassy - January 1944 - February 1944  	
Poland, Silesia & Czechoslovakia - April 1944 - May 1945

See also
 List of German corps in World War II

External links

Army,11
Military units and formations established in 1936
Military units and formations disestablished in 1945